Psammophis mossambicus, the olive grass snake, is a snake that occurs in the northeast of South Africa. The snake grows to 100 to 180 cm in length. The reptile lives in moist places near water. It is olive brown and the scales have dark edges and the belly is yellowish. It can also pick up its front third like the black mamba with which it is confused. The snake is active during the day and eats lizards, frogs, mammals and also other snakes. Its venom is considered moderate.

References 

Fauna of South Africa
Psammophis
Reptiles described in 1882
Taxa named by Wilhelm Peters